Dolní Bělá is a municipality and village in Plzeň-North District in the Plzeň Region of the Czech Republic. It has about 500 inhabitants.

Sights
Dolní Bělá is known for the ruins of Bělá Castle. The castle was built before 1315. Parts of the castle walls are all that has survived to the present day, and the dry moats and ramparts are still visible in some places.

The landmark of the village is the Church of Exaltation of the Holy Cross. It was built in the Empire style in 1822.

Gallery

References

External links

Villages in Plzeň-North District